Posyet is an urban locality (an urban-type settlement) in Khasansky District of Primorsky Krai, Russia, and an ice-free port on the Possiet Bay. Population:

Etymology
It is named after the Russian navigator Konstantin Posyet (1819—1899).

History

It is the oldest settlement in Primorsky Krai. It was established on April 11, 1860 as Novgorodsky-Posyet. The name Novgorodsky was given after the bay named by Nikolay Muravyov-Amursky's expedition.

Economy
Largest enterprise JSC Commercial port of Posyet is owned by Mechel. It is in possession of three  mooring lines of gravitational type.

Climate
Posyet has a monsoonal humid continental climate (Köppen Dwb) with warm, humid and stormy summers and cold, dry winters with little snowfall.

References

External links
Unofficial website of Posyet 
Great Soviet Encyclopedia. Entry on Posyet 

Urban-type settlements in Primorsky Krai
Ports and harbours of Russia